Walter James Nungester (February 22, 1901, Lima, Ohio – September 18, 1985, Ann Arbor, Michigan) was an American bacteriologist and immunologist. He was the president of the American Society for Microbiology in 1951.

Biography
At the University of Michigan, Nungester graduated in 1923 with a B.S., in 1924 with an M.S., and in 1928 with a D.Sc. in bacteriology. His doctoral dissertation is titled Dissociation of Bacillus anthracis. In 1928 he matriculated as a medical student at Northwestern University Medical School (now named Feinberg School of Medicine). There, in the department of bacteriology, he was an instructor from 1928 to 1933 and an assistant professor from 1933 to 1935, when he graduated with an M.D. In the bacteriology department of the University of Michigan Medical School, he was an associate professor from 1935 to 1937 and a full professor from 1947 to 1970, when he retired as professor emeritus. From 1952 to 1970 he chaired the department. He was a member of several learned societies and served on the board of governors of the American Association of Immunologists.

Nungester did research on the biochemistry of phagocytosis, pathogenesis in animal models for experimental pneumonia and experimental anthrax, antiserum in the treatment of pneumonia, development of a vaccine against tuberculosis, and possibilities for vaccines against malignant neoplasms. He also did research on bacterial variation, disinfectants, and resistance to infection.

In 1933 he was elected a Fellow of the American Association for the Advancement of Science. He received in 1952 the Scientific Award from the American Academy of Tuberculosis Physicians and in 1956 the Centennial Distinguished Merit Award from Northwestern University.

Nungester married in 1924 and was the father of two daughters.

Selected publications
  1934

References

1901 births
1985 deaths
American bacteriologists
American immunologists
University of Michigan alumni
Feinberg School of Medicine alumni
University of Michigan faculty
Fellows of the American Association for the Advancement of Science